Holy Cross Mountain is a  mountain summit located in Alberta, Canada.

Description
Precipitation runoff from the mountain drains into Stony and Wileman creeks which are tributaries of the Highwood River. The mountain can be seen from Highway 40 and Highway 541, and is identifiable from as far as Calgary.

History
The mountain was named in the early 1900s by George Pocaterra for the shape of a white cross which appears on the east slope as snowfields melt in the spring.  The mountain's toponym was officially adopted February 28, 1980, by the Geographical Names Board of Canada.

The first ascent of the summit was made in 1937 by Raymond M. Patterson.

Geology
Holy Cross Mountain was created during the Lewis Overthrust. The peak is underlain by folded and thrust-faulted sedimentary rock laid down during the Mesozoic and Paleozoic eras. Formed in shallow seas, this sedimentary rock was pushed east and over the top of younger rock during the Laramide orogeny.

Climate

Based on the Köppen climate classification, Holy Cross Mountain is located in a subarctic climate zone with cold, snowy winters, and mild summers. Winter temperatures can drop below −20 °C with wind chill factors below −30 °C. The months June through September offer the most favorable weather to climb the mountain.

See also
 Kananaskis Country
 Geography of Alberta

References

External links
 Holy Cross Mountain: weather forecast
 Holy Cross Mountain (photo): Flickr

Two-thousanders of Alberta
Canadian Rockies
Alberta's Rockies